Rightmove plc is a UK-based company which runs rightmove.co.uk, the UK's largest online real estate property portal. Rightmove is listed on the London Stock Exchange and is a constituent of the FTSE 100 Index.

History 
Rightmove was incorporated on 16 May 2000 and it launched its website, rightmove.co.uk, in July 2000.  Rightmove's founding shareholders were Countrywide plc, Halifax, Royal & Sun Alliance and Connells.

Rightmove was first listed on the London Stock Exchange on 15 March 2006 at which time it became Rightmove plc. 

In 2007 Rightmove bought 67% of Holiday Lettings Limited. In May 2008, HBOS, one of the founding investors, sold its stake in Rightmove. According to Forbes, Rightmove operates on a two-sided model which serves a vast “audience” for property listings on one side and 20,000 advertisers of available properties on the other side.

In November 2019, the company announced the appointment of Andrew Fisher as its Chairman, succeeding Scott Forbes who was in the role for over 14 years.

Operation
Rightmove makes money from listing estate agents on its website and offering additional advertising products to those agents. The ads are visible to users who search for the area chosen by the estate agent. Individuals selling property privately (i.e. directly without an agent) are prohibited from advertising on the site. Each month, Rightmove release a House Price Index, illustrating any changes in the asking prices of houses throughout England and Wales.

References

External links

Property companies based in London
Real estate companies established in 2000
Online real estate databases
Property services companies of the United Kingdom
Companies listed on the London Stock Exchange
British real estate websites